Julie Anne McGregor (born 26 November 1948) is an Australian television actress and comedian, noted for her roles in comedy.

Career
In the 1970s, McGregor appeared in the Australian sketch comedy The Naked Vicar Show. In the 1980s McGregor appeared in television soap operas including A Country Practice, Punishment and Sons and Daughters.

McGregor is best known to Australian audiences for her role as Betty Wilson, the red-haired dim-witted and ditsy secretary from Walgett in the Australian television comedy series, Hey Dad..!. She continued in the role for the program's entire 1987–1994 run, and also appeared in its short-lived spinoff Hampton Court. In 1992 McGregor was nominated in the Australian Logie Awards in the 'Most Popular Light Entertainment/Comedy Female Performer' category for Hey Dad...!.

Personal life
She is the sister of opera soprano Jennifer McGregor.

After living in Paddington, New South Wales for most of her life, in 2007 McGregor moved to the Blue Mountains, west of Sydney. She lives with her husband, a poet and sculptor, on 0.4 hectares of land in an 1860 sandstone home.

Filmography
The Naked Vicar Show (1977) TV Series .... Various Characters (1977)
Backroads (1977) .... Anna
Palm Beach (1979) .... Kate O'Brien
Don't Ask Us (1980) TV Series
Punishment (1981) TV Series .... Julie Smith
Sons and Daughters (1982) TV Series .... Gloria Dutton (1984)
Deadline (1982) (TV) .... Barneys Girl
The City's Edge (1983) (V) .... Goldilocks
Fast Talking (1984) .... Steve's mother
Hey Dad...! (1986) TV Series .... Betty Wilson (1986–1994)
Hampton Court (1991) TV Series .... Betty Wilson
Leunig Animated (2002) (V) (voice)
Dive Olly Dive (2005) (voice)...Skid

Discography

Albums

References

External links

1948 births
Australian television actresses
Living people
Actresses from Sydney
Australian film actresses